The Foreign Legion Veteran Societies Federation is an association of the association law type of 1901 federating different representations of veteran Legionnaires across the world.

History 

If the associations regrouping veteran Legionnaires rapidly saw daylight throughout the course of the history of this institution, it was in 1912 where the ancestor of the FSALE was created. The first President was Jacques-Emile Maurer, President of the first friendly veteran legionnaires association,, La Légion, created in 1898.

Due to World War I, the veteran association ceased its activities in 1914. In 1920, a new re-launching tentative was initiated, led by Braunschweig, former secretary general, however the regrouping initiative was not made possible due to the insufficient number of associations available to be federated.

L'Union des sociétés d'anciens légionnaires (l'USAL)

Union Veteran Legionnaires Societies (USAL) 

In 1931, following the "Centennial Celebration" (centennial of the creation of the French Foreign Legion), général Rollet, Inspector of the Foreign Legion, regrouped a congressional session of the veteran legionnaires uniting more than 200 participants, members of 23 societies, at Sidi bel-Abbès, "Maison mère" of the Legion during that époque.

It was during this occasion, that was decided the creation of a union whose purpose was to federate the different societies and associations of veteran legionnaires. This union was officially created on June 3 1931 under the presidency of Jacques-Emile Maurer. The union counted accordingly 33 associations members.

World War II was the occasion again to place the initiative in a dormant phase.

Since 1945, the veteran members of the USAL regrouped in order to put in place a congressional session which was held in Paris in 1947, and which united 28 societies.

La Fédération des Sociétés d'Anciens de la Légion étrangère

French Foreign Legion Veteran Societies Federation 

In 1960, the USAL changed designation to French Foreign Legion Veteran Societies Federation.

List of presidents of the USAL and FSALE

Organization 

The association is not a group of particularities, however regroups associations, the general assembly is constituted of representatives of different associations of veteran legionnaires members at the prorata of their active members numbers. 

The functioning is governed by a bureau, the latter having a delegation of the administrative council elected during the course of general assembly. 

Each three years, the general assembly takes motion under the form of a national congressional session organized by one (or several) local(s) association(s) (congressional session: 1998, 2001, 2004, 2007, 2010).

Notable veterans of the institution  

Peter J. Ortiz

See also 

 Major (France)
 French Foreign Legion Music Band (MLE)
 Képi Blanc (publication)
 French Foreign Legion Museum
 Society of Friends of the French Foreign Legion Museum (SAMLE)

References

External links 
Site officiel de la FSALE Official Website of the French Foreign Legion Veteran Societies Federation (Légion étrangère)

French Foreign Legion
Organizations established in 1898